Mount Takanosu is a mountain with a height of 834 meters, located in Hakone, Kanagawa, Japan.

There are a few trails for hiking to the top of Mount Takanosu, such as the route from Horaien (箱根小涌園蓬莱園) to Mount Takanosu via Mount Sengen and down to Lake Ashi. Nearby are the Chisuji Falls (千条ノ滝) and the Hiryu Falls (飛龍ノ滝).

See also
Fuji-Hakone-Izu National Park

References

External links 

Mountains of Kanagawa Prefecture
Hakone, Kanagawa